Pelseneeria bountyensis is a species of small deep-water sea snail. It is a marine gastropod mollusc in the family Eulimidae.

References

 Powell A. W. B., William Collins Publishers Ltd, Auckland, New Zealand 1979 

Eulimidae
Gastropods of New Zealand
Gastropods described in 1933
Taxa named by Arthur William Baden Powell
Endemic fauna of New Zealand
Endemic molluscs of New Zealand